River East is a provincial electoral division in the Canadian province of Manitoba. It was officially created by redistribution in 1979, and has formally existed since the provincial election of 1981.  The riding is located on the northeast corner of the City of Winnipeg. It is bordered by the Red River to the west, the city limit, by Springfield to the north and east, and by the riding of Rossmere to the south.

River East is an affluent district with an average income of $62,534 and an unemployment rate of 5.60% in 1999.  It also has a large immigrant population, at 17% of the total population. Twelve per cent of River East's residents list German as their ethnic origin, while a further 9% list Ukrainian. The riding's total population in 1996 was 19,840.

History 

River East was the only riding in the northern part of Winnipeg to be represented by a Progressive Conservative up until the 2016 general election. Bonnie Mitchelson was the  Member of the Legislative Assembly for the area from 1986 to 2016, and was re-elected five times. Bonnie Mitchelson announced her retirement in October, 2014, and did not seek re-election in the 2016 general election. The seat was won by Cathy Cox, who held it for the Progressive Conservatives while defeating NDP challenger Jody Gillis. Once considered safe for the Progressive Conservatives, the seat became extremely marginal, with Mitchelson being re-elected in the 2007 provincial election by only 52 votes over the New Democrat candidate. Since then, the PC majorities have increased in 2011 and 2016.

List of provincial representatives

Electoral results

2016 Manitoba general election

2011 Manitoba general election

2007 Manitoba general election

2003 Manitoba general election

1999 Manitoba general election

Previous boundaries

References

Former provincial electoral districts of Manitoba
Politics of Winnipeg